Wanderlust is a studio album by Australian jazz musician Mike Bukovsky, released in 1993.

At the ARIA Music Awards of 1994 the album won the ARIA Award for Best Jazz Album.

Track listing
 "Bronte Cafe"	- 6:56
 "Dakar" - 9:37
 "I Hear You" - 8:30
 "Only Connect" - 9:07
 "Ornettelogic" - 13:35
 "Game of Gulf" - 6:10
 "MDD" - 7:54
 "Pressure Makes Diamonds" - 4:25
 "Mr Whippy" - 9:40

References

1993 albums
ARIA Award-winning albums
Jazz albums by Australian artists